Darko Bjedov (born 28 March 1989) is a Serbian footballer who plays for Radnik.

Club career
Born in Knin, Bjedov started his career with Železničar Beograd. Later he played member of several Belgrade clubs, Radnički, Čukarički and Mladenovac. He was fully affirmed playing with Timok and Inđija in the Serbian First League. After a season with Zeta in the 2015–16 Montenegrin First League, where he was second scorer with 18 goals in 33 matches, Bjedov joined Javor Ivanjica. After he scored 10 goals on 20 Serbian SuperLiga matches during the first half of 2016–17 Serbian SuperLiga season, Bjedov signed two-and-a-half year deal with K.A.A. Gent on 9 January 2017. In February 2018, Bjedov joined Rad, on loan deal from Gent, until the end of the 2017–18 Serbian SuperLiga campaign. On 27 August 2018, Bjedov signed a two-year-deal with Vojvodina.

References

External sources
 
 
 
 

1989 births
Sportspeople from Knin
Living people
Serbs of Croatia
Serbian footballers
Association football forwards
FK Železničar Beograd players
FK Radnički Beograd players
FK Radnički Obrenovac players
FK Čukarički players
OFK Mladenovac players
FK Timok players
FK Inđija players
FK Zeta players
FK Javor Ivanjica players
K.A.A. Gent players
FK Rad players
FK Vojvodina players
FC Atyrau players
Serbian First League players
Serbian SuperLiga players
Montenegrin First League players
Belgian Pro League players
Kazakhstan Premier League players
Serbian expatriate footballers
Expatriate footballers in Montenegro
Expatriate footballers in Belgium
Expatriate footballers in Kazakhstan
Serbian expatriate sportspeople in Montenegro
Serbian expatriate sportspeople in Belgium
Serbian expatriate sportspeople in Kazakhstan
Expatriate footballers in Iran